Jordan Walne (born 28 December 1992) is an English professional  rugby league footballer who plays in the  for the Barrow Raiders in the Betfred Championship. He has previously played for Hull Kingston Rovers and the Salford Red Devils in the Super League, plus Oldham RLFC (Heritage № 1315) on dual-registration.

Background
He is the brother of fellow rugby league footballer, Adam Walne. As an amateur he played for the Leyland Warriors, based at Malt Kiln Fold, Leyland.

Senior career

Salford Red Devils (2013-17)

2013
Walne made his senior début for Salford on 21 April 2013, in a Challenge Cup match against the Gloucestershire All Golds. Walne made his Super League début on 4 August 2013, in the Salford Red Devils' fixture against Huddersfield.

Hull Kingston Rovers (2018)

2018
In October 2017, Walne signed a one-year deal to play for Hull Kingston Rovers in the Super League.
It was revealed on 10 October 2018, that Walne would be departing Hull Kingston Rovers following a restructure of the club's on field personnel.

Leigh Centurions (2018)

2018
It was revealed on 26 July 2018, that Walne would spend the remainder of the 2018 rugby league season at Leigh. On a loan basis from his parent-club Hull Kingston Rovers.

Walne was followed to Leigh club by two of his current Hull Kingston Rovers teammates in Will Dagger and Josh Johnson as part of the same loan deal. Walne made his Leigh début against the Sheffield Eagles on 29 July 2018, in a 34-10 triumph in the Championship league competition.

Barrow Raiders (2019 - present)

2019
Ahead of the start of the 2019 rugby league season, Walne signed a one-year contract to play for the Barrow Raiders. Walne made his début for the Barrow Raiders on 3 February 2019, in an 18-22 victory over Batley. Walne scored his first try for the Barrow Raiders on 24 March 2019, during a 26-33 defeat by Swinton.

Dual-registration
Walne has featured on dual-registration for several clubs including, Oldham (two separate registrations, 2013 and 2017), Workington Town, North Wales Crusaders, Halifax R.L.F.C. and the York City Knights.

References

External links
Salford profile
SL profile

1992 births
Living people
English rugby league players
Halifax R.L.F.C. players
Hull Kingston Rovers players
Leigh Leopards players
North Wales Crusaders players
Oldham R.L.F.C. players
Rugby league locks
Rugby league players from Greater Manchester
Rugby league props
Rugby league second-rows
Salford Red Devils players
Workington Town players
York City Knights players